Flora Lucy Freeman (4 April 1869 – 23 May 1960) was a British philanthropist and writer. She was known for starting clubs for girls and then writing to tell others how to also organise similar clubs. She was a Roman Catholic convert and she helped form Catholic Girl Guide troupes.

Life
Freeman was born in Westminster in 1869. Her parents, Emily and William Henry Freeman, were Anglicans. Her father was a general practitioner. She had three elder brothers, she was well read and her family employed a nurse who she would read novels to. She became a writer.

She and Maude Stanley were involved in creating clubs for girls. Her first club was formed when she was 21. She had disliked needlework as a child but now these skills became essential to her clubs. The girls would learn how to hand sew and they would also get access to a sewing machine. She published "Religious and Social Work" in 1901 in which she confesses her own shyness when talking about religious subjects to strangers. She explains her own approach and how upper and middle class girls can assist working class girls if they realise that they too can learn from the experience. At this time helping in girls' clubs was a fashionable hobby for upper class girls who were denied a career or higher education. One report from the Cleckheaton Girls’ Friendly Society in 1896 records that the helpers could not understand the lives of the clubs members and the clubs members could not understand what the upper-class helpers were saying.

In Brighton she developed a special interest organisation to co-ordinate local clubs for "working-girls" named the "Brighton Girls’ Club Union" in 1906. In 1908 she published Our Working-girls and how to Help Them: With Special Reference to Clubs and Classes. She wrote of the pleasures of shaping the "rough stone of slum childhood" and that although the leaders of these clubs would teach,they would alsolearn from the clubs members.

In 1911 she was involved with the creation of the National Organisation of Girls Clubs if only in the writing she had published in support of clubs for girls. She was an active member of the Girl Guide association. In 1916 she converted to Roman Catholicism and in March of that year she formed her first Catholic Girl Guide company the "11th Brighton". The next year the "6th Hove" followed and in 1919 the "23rd Brighton".

In 1921 she published the first handbook for Catholic Guides.

Freeman died in 1960 in Brighton.

References

1869 births
1960 deaths
People from Westminster
British philanthropists
Girl Guiding and Girl Scouting
People from Brighton and Hove